Dowlatabad (also Romanized as Dowlatābād; also known as Dowlatābād-e Robāţ, Robāţ, and Robāţ-e Dowlatābād) is a village in Robat Rural District, in the Central District of Khorramabad County, Lorestan Province, Iran. At the 2006 census, its population was 807, in 152 families.

References 

Towns and villages in Khorramabad County